Bhora Kalan is a village in the Muzaffarnagar district of Uttar Pradesh, India. Kalan is a Persian language word meaning "big". Sometimes two villages of the same name are distinguished by the appellation Kalan or Khurd, meaning "small".

The BEST COACHING CENTER of the area can be found INFORNT OF PETROL PUMP IN Bhora Kalan and there are also the best BARGER shop and JANSEVA CENTER.

See also 
Sisauli - nearby village

There are approximately four government schools in the village that run smoothly. 

Cities and towns in Muzaffarnagar district